Plackett is the surname of:
 Robin Plackett (1920–2009), English statistician
 William H. Plackett (1937–2016), US Navy officer
 Lawrence Plackett (1869–1939), English footballer
 Harry Plackett (1871–1948), English footballer
 Syd Plackett (1896–1946), English footballer
 Zandra Plackett, a fictional character in the UK TV series Bad Girls
 Richard Plackett, former head of small and mid cap investment at BlackRock, Welsh international bridge player and runner up in the IPPR economics prize